Yekaterina Viktorovna Galitskaya (Cyrillic: Екатерина Викторовна Галицкая; born 24 February 1987 in Rostov-on-Don) is a Russian hurdler. At the 2012 Summer Olympics, she competed in the Women's 100 metres hurdles, reaching the semifinals. In February 2019, the Court of Arbitration for Sport handed her a four-year ban for doping, starting from 1 February 2019 with all her results from 15 July 2012 to 31 December 2014 disqualified. On appeal, her ban was reduced from four years to three years.

Competition record

See also
List of doping cases in athletics
Doping at the Olympic Games
List of people from Rostov-on-Don

References

1987 births
Living people
Sportspeople from Rostov-on-Don
Russian female hurdlers
Olympic female hurdlers
Olympic athletes of Russia
Athletes (track and field) at the 2012 Summer Olympics
World Athletics Championships athletes for Russia
Russian Athletics Championships winners
Doping cases in athletics
Russian sportspeople in doping cases